The 2016 United States Senate elections were held on November 8, 2016. The presidential election, House elections, 14 gubernatorial elections, and many state and local elections were held on the same date.

In the elections, 34 of the 100 seats—all Class 3 Senate seats—were contested in regular elections; the winners will serve six-year terms until January 3, 2023. Class 3 was last up for election in 2010, when Republicans won a net gain of six seats.

In 2016, Democrats defended 10 seats, while Republicans defended 24 seats. Republicans, having won a majority of seats in the Senate in 2014, held the Senate majority with 54 seats before this election. Although Democrats made a net gain of two seats and did not lose any of their seats, Republicans retained control of the Senate for the 115th United States Congress. The two Democratic gains came from the defeats of incumbents Kelly Ayotte in New Hampshire and Mark Kirk in Illinois by Democrats Maggie Hassan and Tammy Duckworth, respectively.

Despite Republicans retaining control of the Senate, 2016 marked the first time since 1986 where Democrats made a net gain of seats in Class 3. This is also the only election cycle since the popular-vote election of senators was mandated by the Seventeenth Amendment in 1913 that the winning party in every Senate election mirrored the winning party for their state in the presidential election. This feat had nearly been accomplished earlier in 1920, which also involved the Class 3 Senate seats, and nearly repeated in 2020; in both cases, every state, with the exception of Kentucky in 1920 and Maine in 2020, voted for the same party in the presidential election and their Senate election. In addition, this election marked the first time since 2000 in which the party in opposition to the elected or reelected presidential candidate made net gains in the Senate; both cases involved the election of a Republican president and the Democrats making gains in the Senate.

With the retirement of Harry Reid, Chuck Schumer became the Democratic leader after the elections, while Mitch McConnell retained his position as Senate Majority Leader.

As of 2022, this is the most recent election cycle in which Republicans won Senate races in Arizona, Georgia, or Pennsylvania. It is also the most recent election cycle where there were no special elections.

Results summary 
All 34 Class 3 senators were up for election in 2016; Class 3 consisted of 10 Democrats and 24 Republicans. Of the senators not up for election, 34 of the senators not up for election were Democrats, 30 senators were Republicans, and two senators were independents who caucused with the Senate Democrats.

Source: Clerk of the U.S. House of Representatives

Change in composition

Before the elections

After the elections

Final pre-election predictions 
Several sites and individuals publish predictions of competitive seats. These predictions look at factors such as the strength of the incumbent (if the incumbent is running for reelection) and the other candidates, and the state's partisan lean (reflected in part by the state's Cook Partisan Voting Index rating). The predictions assign ratings to each seat, indicating the predicted advantage that a party has in winning that seat.

Most election predictors used:
 "tossup": no advantage
 "tilt" (used by some predictors): advantage that is not quite as strong as "lean"
 "lean": slight advantage
 "likely" or "favored": significant, but surmountable, advantage
 "safe" or "solid": near-certain chance of victory

Where a site gives a percentage probability as its primary indicator of expected outcome, the chart below classifies a race as follows:
 Tossup: 50-55%
 Tilt: 56-60%
 Lean: 61-75%
 Likely: 76-93%
 Safe: 94-100%

The New York Times's Upshot gave the Democrats a 60% chance of winning the Senate on August 24, 2016; on September 23, their model gave Republicans a 58% chance to maintain control.

Primary dates
This table shows the primary dates for regularly-scheduled elections. It also shows the type of primary.
 "Open" primary: any registered voter can vote in any party's primary
 "Closed" primary, only voters registered with a specific party can vote in that party's primary.
 "Top-two" primary, all candidates run against each other regardless of party affiliation, and the top two candidates advance to the second round of voting. (In Louisiana, a candidate can win the election by winning a majority of the vote in the first round.)
 All of the various other primary types are classified as "hybrid." Alaska in 2008 provides one example of a hybrid primary: The Democratic Party allowed unaffiliated voters to vote in its primary, while the Republican Party only allowed party members to vote in its primary.

Indicates a state that requires primary run-off elections under certain conditions.

Gains, losses and holds

Retirements
Three Democrats and two Republicans retired instead of seeking re-election.

Defeats
Two Republicans sought re-election but lost in the general election.

Race summary

Elections leading to the next Congress 
In these general elections, the winners were elected for the term beginning January 3, 2017; ordered by state.

All of the elections involved the Class 3 seats.

Closest races 
Nine races had a margin of victory under 10%:

Alabama 

Incumbent Republican Richard Shelby won re-election to a sixth term in office. The primaries were held on March 1. Ron Crumpton, a marijuana legalization activist, was the Democratic nominee. Shelby won re-election with 63.9% of the vote.

Shelby was first elected to the Senate in 1986 as a Democrat and was easily re-elected in 1992 as such. He switched his party affiliation to Republican on November 9, 1994, one day after the Republicans won control of both houses in the midterm elections. He won his first full term as a Republican in 1998 by a large margin and faced no significant opposition in 2004 or 2010.

Following the divisive Republican primary in Mississippi ahead of the 2014 election in which Senator Thad Cochran was almost defeated, it had been speculated that Shelby could also face a Tea Party primary challenger, due to his lengthy tenure and support for federal largesse. However, that didn't happen, in part due to his large campaign war chest, which stood at $19.4 million as of September 2015. If Shelby had decided to retire, numerous high-profile Alabama Republicans were speculated to run, including U.S. Representatives Robert Aderholt, Mo Brooks, Bradley Byrne, Gary Palmer, Martha Roby, and Mike Rogers, State Treasurer Young Boozer, State Speaker Mike Hubbard, Lieutenant Governor Kay Ivey, State Senate President Pro Tempore Del Marsh, Secretary of State John Merrill, U.S. Appeals Court Judge William H. Pryor Jr., former Governor Bob Riley, and Attorney General Luther Strange.  Shelby announced in January 2015 that he would run for re-election.

Alaska 

Two-term Senator Lisa Murkowski (Republican) was appointed in 2002 and elected to a full term in 2004. She was defeated in the Republican primary in 2010 by Joe Miller. She later ran as a write-in candidate in the 2010 general election and was re-elected to a second full term with 40% of the vote, making her one of two senators in US history to win election via write-in votes. She was 59 years old in 2016. She ran for re-election.

Thomas Lamb, a candidate for the State House in 2006, and Bob Lochner filed to run against Murkowski. Other potential Republican primary challengers included 2010 nominee and 2014 candidate Joe Miller, State Senator Mike J. Dunleavy, former Lieutenant Governor Mead Treadwell, and former Mayor of Anchorage Dan Sullivan.

The only person to file for the Democratic primary as of May 20 was writer and satirist Richard Grayson, who previously sought election to Wyoming's House seat in 2014. Potential Democratic candidates included State Senator Dennis Egan, State Representative Andy Josephson, State Senator Bill Wielechowski, State Senator Hollis French and State Senate Minority Leader Johnny Ellis. Former Senator Mark Begich was mentioned as a possible candidate, but he declined to run.

Murkowski won her primary on August 16, 2016 with 72 percent of the vote. Joe Miller received the Libertarian nomination and ran against Murkowski in the general election. Anchorage attorney and veteran Margaret Stock ran as an Independent candidate.

Murkowski won re-election with 44% of the vote compared to Miller with 30% and Metcalfe with 11%. 15% went to other candidates. Murkowski has been re-elected three times now with 48% in 2004, 39.5% in 2010 and 44% in 2016, never having won a majority.

Arizona 

Five-term Senator and Republican presidential candidate in 2008 John McCain was re-elected with 59% of the vote in 2010. He was 80 years old in 2016. Despite speculation that he might retire, McCain ran for re-election.

McCain faced primary challenges from Fair Tax activist Alex Meluskey, businessman David Pizer, talk radio host Clair Van Steenwyk, and State Senator Kelli Ward. David Pizer later dropped out of the race. Representatives Matt Salmon and David Schweikert were both mentioned as possible candidates, but both chose not to run. Other potential Republican candidates included former Governor Jan Brewer, businesswoman and 2014 gubernatorial candidate Christine Jones, former Governor of Alaska and 2008 vice presidential candidate Sarah Palin, former U.S. Representative John Shadegg, and former Arizona Attorney General Grant Woods.

Congresswoman Ann Kirkpatrick and teacher Lennie Clark ran for the Democratic nomination. Lennie Clark dropped out and Ann Kirkpatrick became the Democratic nominee. Other potential Democratic candidates included U.S. Representative Ruben Gallego, former Surgeon General and 2012 nominee Richard Carmona, 2014 gubernatorial nominee Fred DuVal, Phoenix Mayor Greg Stanton, and retired astronaut Mark Kelly, who is the husband of ex-Congresswoman Gabby Giffords.

Sen. McCain won re-election with 53% to Kirkpatrick's 41%.

Arkansas 

One-term Senator John Boozman (Republican) defeated two-term Senator Blanche Lincoln with 58% of the vote in 2010. He was 65 years old in 2016. Despite speculation that he might retire following health problems, Boozman ran for re-election. Fellow Republican Curtis Coleman, who ran against Boozman in 2010 but came in fifth place, ran again.

Conner Eldridge, the former U.S. Attorney for the Western District of Arkansas, is the only Democrat who met the filing deadline.

Frank Gilbert was the candidate for the Libertarian Party, and Jason Tate was running a write-in campaign.

Incumbent Republican Senator John Boozman won re-election to a second term in office, becoming the first Republican senator re-elected in the history of the state.

Sen. Boozman won re-election with 60% to Eldridge's 36%.

California 

Four-term Senator Barbara Boxer (Democrat) was re-elected with 52% of the vote in 2010. Boxer declined to run for re-election. California Attorney General Kamala Harris and U.S. Representative Loretta Sanchez, both Democrats, finished first and second, respectively, in California's nonpartisan blanket primary, and contested the general election. As such, Boxer's successor was guaranteed to be a Democrat. This marked a historic first such occasion in California, ever since the Senate elections began in 1914.

Other Democrats on the primary ballot included "President" Cristina Grappo, Massie Munroe, Herbert Peters, Emory Rogers, and Steve Stokes. Among the potential candidates who declined to run were Governor Jerry Brown, Lieutenant Governor Gavin Newsom, U.S. Representatives Xavier Becerra and Adam Schiff, and Los Angeles Mayor Eric Garcetti.

Former state Republican Party chairs Tom Del Beccaro and Duf Sundheim, and former State Senator Phil Wyman ran, along with Don Krampe, Tom Palzer, Karen Roseberry, Greg Conlon, Von Huogo, Jerry Laws, Ron Unz, Jarrell Williamson, and George Yang. State Assemblymen Rocky Chavez was running as well, but withdrew from the race. Republicans who were once considered potential candidates but ruled out runs included San Diego Mayor Kevin Faulconer, former Assistant Secretary of the Treasury for Financial Stability and 2014 gubernatorial nominee Neel Kashkari, U.S. Representative Darrell Issa, and businesswoman and nominee for the U.S. Senate in 2010 Carly Fiorina.

Independent Mike Beitiks ran on a single-issue climate change platform.

Polling conducted by the SurveyUSA from March 30, 2016 to April 3, 2016 indicated that Harris was ahead with 26%, compared to Rep. Sánchez with 22%, Del Beccaro with 8%, Wyman with 8%, and Sundheim with 3%; 7% of those polled were supporting other candidates, and 24% were undecided.

Harris won the election with 62% of the vote to Sanchez's 38%.

Colorado 

One-term Senator Michael Bennet (Democrat) was appointed in 2009 and elected to a full term with 48% of the vote in 2010. He was 51 years old in 2016. He ran for re-election.

Businessman Robert Blaha, former Aurora councilman Ryan Frazier, El Paso County Commissioners Darryl Glenn, and Peggy Littleton, former Colorado State University Athletic Director Jack Graham, State Representative Jon Keyser, former SBA director Greg Lopez, State Senator Tim Neville, and Jefferson County Commissioner Donald Rosier ran for the Republican nomination. Glenn, Graham, Blaha, Keyser, and Frazier actually competed in the primary.

Darryl Glenn won the Republican nomination with 37% of the vote against four other opponents.

Bennet won re-election with 50% of the vote to Glenn's 44%.

Connecticut 

One-term Senator Richard Blumenthal (Democrat) was elected with 55% of the vote in 2010. He was 70 years old in 2016. He ran for re-election.

State Representative Dan Carter, apparel company CEO and 2004 Senate nominee Jack Orchulli, and former Olympic athlete August Wolf ran for the Republican nomination. Another potential candidate was former West Hartford Town Councilor Joe Visconti, who ran for CT-01 in 2008 and ran as an Independent for Governor in 2014. Former U.S. Comptroller General and 2014 candidate for Lieutenant Governor David M. Walker, former U.S. Representative and 2010 candidate Rob Simmons, and economist and former CNBC television host Lawrence Kudlow declined to run.

Blumenthal won re-election with 63% of the vote to Carter's 35%.

Florida 

One-term Senator Marco Rubio (Republican) was elected in a three-way race with 49% of the vote in 2010. In April 2014, Rubio stated that he would not run for both the Senate and President in 2016, as Florida law prohibits a candidate from appearing twice on a ballot. In April 2015, he announced that he would run for President and would not seek re-election. After suspending his campaign on March 15, 2016, Rubio announced on June 22, 2016 that he changed his mind and will run for re-election.

U.S. Representative Ron DeSantis, combat veteran Todd Wilcox, real estate developer Carlos Beruff, retired college lecturer Ilya Katz, and Donald J. DeRenzo ran for the Republican nomination.
Ben Carson, retired neurosurgeon and candidate for President in 2016 was also mentioned as a potential candidate. On June 17, 2016, U.S. Representative David Jolly withdrew from the race to run for re-election to his House seat, four days after Rubio began openly considering reversing his decision to not run for re-election.

U.S. Representative Patrick Murphy defeated fellow representative Alan Grayson, as well as Pam Keith, Lateresa Jones, Richard Coleman, Sam Brian Gibbons, and Josh Larose, for the Democratic nomination. Murphy lost to incumbent Marco Rubio in the November general election on November 8.

Sen. Rubio won re-election with 52% of the vote compared to Murphy's 44%.

Georgia 

Two-term Senator Johnny Isakson (Republican) was re-elected with 58% of the vote in 2010. He was 71 years old in 2016. He ran for re-election. In 2015, Isakson announced he was being treated for Parkinson's disease, but stated that his treatment would not interfere with his re-election campaign or his ability to serve another term.

Mary Kay Bacallao, college professor, former Fayette County Board of Education member, and candidate for State Superintendent of Schools in 2014 and Derrick Grayson, candidate for the state's other Senate seat in 2014, challenged Isakson for the Republican nomination. Isakson won the Republican nomination with more than three quarters of the vote.

Investment firm executive Jim Barksdale, project manager Cheryl Copeland, and businessman John Coyne ran for the Democratic nomination. USAF veteran Jim Knox was running but dropped out of the race. Barksdale defeated Copeland in a close race to win the Democratic nomination.

Sen. Isakson won re-election with 55% to Barksdale's 41%.

Hawaii 

In 2012, Hawaii Governor Neil Abercrombie appointed Lieutenant Governor Brian Schatz (Democrat) to take the place of deceased nine-term Senator Daniel Inouye. Schatz won a 2014 special election to serve the remainder of Inouye's term. Schatz ran for re-election.

Former U.S. Representative and 2014 Senate candidate Colleen Hanabusa considered challenging Schatz in the primary again, while U.S. Representative Tulsi Gabbard declined to seek the Democratic nomination for the seat.

Charles Collins, a Republican who ran for the Senate in 2012 and for Governor in 2014, was seeking the nomination again, but withdrew from the race.

Sen. Schatz won re-election with 74% of the vote compared to Carroll's 22%.

Idaho 

Three-term Senator Mike Crapo (Republican) was re-elected with 71% of the vote in 2010. Crapo was 65 years old in 2016. He ran for re-election. U.S Representative Raul Labrador declined to challenge Crapo in the Republican primary.

Jerry Sturgill ran for the Democratic nomination.

Perennial candidate Pro-Life ran as an independent. He was defeated in the Constitution Party primary on May 17, 2016 to Ray J. Writz.

Sen. Crapo was re-elected.

Illinois 

One-term Senator Mark Kirk (Republican) was elected with 48% of the vote in 2010. He was 57 years old in 2016. He ran for re-election. Kirk suffered a stroke in January 2012 that kept him away from the Senate until January 2013. In June 2013, he confirmed that he was planning to run for re-election, but speculation he might retire persisted. In November 2014, Kirk reiterated that he was going to run for re-election, saying: "No frickin' way am I retiring."

Joe Walsh, a former U.S. Representative and conservative talk radio host, declined to challenge Kirk in the Republican primary. Two others filed for the right to challenge Senator Kirk in the primary: businessman James Marter, and Elizabeth Pahlke, but Pahlke was disqualified, so only Marter was on the ballot running against Kirk. On March 15, Kirk won the primary with 71% of the vote.

U.S. Representative Tammy Duckworth, President and CEO of the Chicago Urban League, Andrea Zopp, and State Senator Napoleon Harris ran for the Democratic nomination. On March 15, Duckworth won the primary with 64% of the vote.

In December 2015, Jim Brown, a teacher and former businessman, announced he was running as an independent.

Chris Aguayo, an Iraq/Afghan War veteran and Veterans Party State Chair, announced he was running, representing the Veterans Party.

Rep. Duckworth unseated Sen. Kirk with 55% compared to his 40%.

Indiana 

Three-term Senator Dan Coats (Republican) was elected with 55% of the vote in 2010; Coats served in the Senate from 1989 to 1999 and then returned to serve another term from 2011 to 2017. Coats did not run for re-election. Republican candidates include U.S. Representatives Marlin Stutzman and Todd Young. Coats's chief of Staff Eric Holcomb was a candidate, but withdrew from the race.

Former U.S. Representative Baron Hill won the Democratic nomination on May 3, but withdrew in July 2016 in favor of Evan Bayh. Bayh held the seat from 1999 until his retirement in 2011, and also served as Governor of Indiana from 1989 to 1997. Former non-profit director John Dickerson also announced he was going to run, but suspended his campaign in early 2016.

Former Sen. Bayh lost his bid to regain his seat to Rep. Young. Rep Young garnered 52% to Bayh's 42%

Iowa 

Six-term Senator Chuck Grassley was re-elected with 65% of the vote in 2010. He was 83 years old in 2016. He ran for re-election. Talk radio host Robert Rees announced he was going to challenge Grassley for the nomination, but later withdrew.

Former Lt Governor Patty Judge earned the Democratic nomination by defeating State Senator Rob Hogg, former state Senator Tom Fiegen, and former state representative Bob Krause. Former state representative Ray Zirkelbach briefly ran but ended his campaign soon after.

Sen. Grassley won re-election with 60% to Judge's 36%.

Kansas 

One-term Senator Jerry Moran (Republican) was elected with 70% of the vote in 2010. He was 62 years old in 2016. He ran for re-election. Radiologist and 2014 Senate candidate Milton R. Wolf and U.S. Representative Tim Huelskamp declined to run.

Patrick Wiesner, an attorney and a candidate for the Senate in 2010 and 2014, defeated Monique Singh-Bey for the Democratic nomination. Potential candidates who declined to run included Wichita Mayor Carl Brewer, 2014 Governor nominee Paul Davis, former Kansas City Mayor Joe Reardon, former U.S. Representative and 2008 nominee Jim Slattery, and 2014 KS-02 nominee Margie Wakefield.

Sen. Moran won re-election with 62% to Wiesner's 32%.

Kentucky 

One-term Senator Rand Paul (Republican) was elected with 56% of the vote in 2010. He was 53 years old in 2016. Paul filed for re-election, although he was also running for President of the United States in 2016. Although Kentucky law did not allow for a candidate to appear twice on the same ballot, Paul successfully convinced the Kentucky GOP to adopt a caucus system for 2016, allowing Paul to run for president and for the Senate simultaneously. Kentucky law still bars Paul from appearing twice on the ballot in the general election. However, on February 3, 2016, Paul ended his campaign for the presidency and ran for reelection. James Gould and Stephen Slaughter filed to run against Paul. Paul won the Republican primary, receiving 169,180 votes (about 85%); James R. Gould received 16,611 (about 8%) and Stephen Howard Slaughter received 13,728 (about 7%).

Lexington Mayor Jim Gray, Rory Houlihan, Ron Leach, Sellus Wilder Jeff Kender, Tom Recktenwald (who was a candidate in 2014), and Grant Short ran for the Democratic nomination. Gray won the nomination.

Paul won re-election with 57% of the vote to Gray's 43%.

Louisiana 

Two-term Senator David Vitter (Republican) was re-elected with 57% of the vote in 2010. After losing the 2015 gubernatorial race, Vitter chose to retire from the Senate at the end of his term.

Republicans who ran for the seat included U.S. Representatives Charles Boustany and John Fleming, former U.S. Representative Joseph Cao, State Treasurer John Kennedy, retired U.S. Air Force Colonel Rob Maness, and former Louisiana State Representative David Duke. Other potential Republican candidates included Public Service Commissioner Erik Skrmetta, 2014 candidate for LA-05 Zach Dasher, state representative Paul Hollis, and former President of Jefferson Parish John Young.

Democratic candidates included Public Service Commissioner Foster Campbell, attorney Derrick Edwards, Caroline Fayard, an attorney and candidate for Lieutenant Governor in 2010, and businessman Josh Pellerin. Other potential Democratic candidates included state legislators Robert Johnson, Eric LaFleur, and Gary Smith Jr., and Mayor of Alexandria Jacques Roy. Former U.S. Senator Mary Landrieu and her brother, New Orleans Mayor Mitch Landrieu, declined to run.

As no candidate won a majority of the vote in the "jungle primary", a runoff election was held on December 10 to choose between Kennedy and Campbell (the 2 candidates with the most votes in the primary).  John Kennedy was declared the winner of the runoff election with 61% of the vote to Campbell's 39%.

Maryland 

Five-term U.S. Senator Barbara Mikulski of the Democratic Party was re-elected with 62% of the vote in 2010. She is the longest-serving female senator and the longest-serving woman in the history of the U.S. Congress. She did not seek re-election.

The candidates who filed for the Democratic nomination were: U.S. Representatives Donna Edwards and Chris Van Hollen, Freddie Donald Dickson Jr., Ralph Jaffe, Theresa Scaldaferri, Charles Smith, Violate Staley, Blaine Taylor, Ed Tinus, and Lih Young. Van Hollen won the April 26 primary.

The Republican candidates who filed were former Deputy Assistant Secretary of Defense and Senate candidate in 2012 Richard Douglas, Chrys Kefalas, State Delegate Kathy Szeliga, Chris Chaffee, Sean Connor, John Graziani, Greg Holmes, Joseph David Hooe, Mark McNicholas, Lynn Richardson, Anthony Seda, Richard Shawver, Dave Walle, and Garry T. Yarrington. Szeliga won the primary to face Van Hollen in the general election.

Rep. Van Hollen won election to the Senate with 61% of the vote to Szeliga's 36%.

Missouri 

One-term Senator Roy Blunt (Republican) was elected with 54% of the vote in 2010. He was 66 years old in 2016. He ran for re-election. Former U.S. Representative and 2012 Senate nominee Todd Akin was rumored to be a possible candidate, but declined to run. Three candidates ran against Blunt for the Republican nomination, the best-known being sales manager, Tea Party activist, and 2010 candidate Kristin Nichols, but Blunt won decisively with 72% of the vote.

For the Democrats, Secretary of State Jason Kander easily won the nomination, defeating Robert Mack, Pastor Cori Bush and activist Chief Wana Dubie. Governor Jay Nixon and State Treasurer Clint Zweifel chose not to seek election to the Senate.

Sen. Blunt won re-election with 49% of the vote to Kander's 46%.

Nevada

Five-term Senator and Senate Minority Leader Harry Reid (Democrat) was re-elected with 50% of the vote in 2010. Reid did not seek re-election. Former Nevada Attorney General Catherine Cortez Masto earned the Democratic nomination, defeating Bobby Mahendra, Liddo Susan O'Briant, and Allen Rheinhart in the primary on June 14, 2016.

Congressman Joe Heck defeated eight candidates, including 2010 nominee Sharron Angle, who ran against Reid in 2010, for the Republican nomination.

Jarrod M. Williams, an independent candidate ran for the seat. He describes himself as a Democratic Socialist, a supporter of Bernie Sanders, and is a member of the Socialist Party USA, although the party doesn't have a chapter in the State of Nevada.
Cortez Masto was elected with 47.1% of the vote to Heck's 44.7%.

New Hampshire 

One-term Senator Kelly Ayotte (Republican) was elected with 60% of the vote in 2010. She was 48 years old in 2016. Ayotte ran for re-election. Jim Rubens, a former state senator, candidate for Governor in 1998 and for the Senate in 2014, announced a challenge to Ayotte in the primary, but Ayotte won the nomination.

Brian Chabot is the Libertarian candidate for US Senate in 2016.  He is a relative newcomer to politics, having run for US Senate in 2010 and US Representative in 2014.

Governor Maggie Hassan ran for the Democratic nomination. Other potential candidates include Executive Councilor Chris Pappas, State Senators Dan Feltes and Donna Soucy, Portsmouth City Councilor and daughter of U.S. Senator Jeanne Shaheen Stefany Shaheen, and campaign manager for Senator Shaheen Mike Vlacich.

A series of polls taken by WMUR/UNH in February, April, and July 2016, as well as WBUR polls taken in May and July/August, show Hassan gaining support over time and now leading Ayotte.

Gov. Hassan won a very close election, 353,978 or 47.97%, to Sen. Ayotte's 353,262 or 47.87%, a difference of 716 votes. Sen. Ayotte conceded the race to Gov. Hassan around noon Wednesday November 9, 2016.

New York 

Three-term Senator Chuck Schumer (Democrat) was re-elected with 66% of the vote in 2010. He was 66 years old in 2016. He ran for re-election. Chuck Schumer had been elected leader of the Senate Democrats on November 16, 2016, succeeding Harry Reid.

Wendy Long, the Republican nominee in 2012, ran as the nominee of Republican, Conservative, and Reform Parties. Other potential Republican candidates included U.S. Representatives Chris Gibson and Peter T. King. U.S. Representative Richard L. Hanna, Manhattan Republican Party Chairwoman Adele Malpass, and former CNBC television host Larry Kudlow were also mentioned as possible candidates, but all have declined to run.

Robin Laverne Wilson, the Green Party of New York nominee, received 1.5% of the vote. Alex Merced, the Libertarian Party candidate, received 0.7% of the vote.

North Carolina 

Two-term Senator Richard Burr (Republican) was re-elected with 55% of the vote in 2010. He was 61 years old in 2016. There had been speculation that Burr might retire, but he ran for re-election.

Three Republicans challenged Burr in the primary: Greg Brannon, Larry Holmquist, and former Superior Court Judge Paul Wright. On March 15, Burr won the primary with 61% of the vote.

Former state representative Deborah Ross, Spring Lake Mayor Chris Rey, businessman Kevin Griffin, and retired U.S. Army Captain Ernest Reeves ran for the Democratic nomination. Former U.S. Senator Kay Hagan, state treasurer Janet Cowell, and Anthony Foxx, the United States Secretary of Transportation and former Mayor of Charlotte, declined to run. On March 15, Ross won the primary with 62% of the vote.

Burr won re-election 51% to 45% for Ross.

North Dakota 

One-term Senator John Hoeven (Republican) was elected with 76% of the vote in 2010. He was 59 years old in 2016. He ran for re-election.

Democrats endorsed state representative Eliot Glassheim On November 7, 2015, the Libertarian party nominated Robert Marquette.

Hoeven defeated Glassheim 78% to 17%.

Ohio 

One-term Senator Rob Portman (Republican) was elected with 57% of the vote in 2010. He was 60 years old in 2016. He ran for re-election. He had considered running for President, but decided not to.

Two candidates filed to challenge him: Don Elijah Eckhart, who ran for OH-15 as an independent in 2008, and Melissa Strzala, but Strzala was disqualified. On March 15, Portman won the primary with 82% of the vote.

Former Governor and Congressman Ted Strickland, Cincinnati City Councilman P.G. Sittenfeld, and occupational therapist Kelli Prather ran for the Democratic nomination. Former State Representative Bob Hagan had filed papers to run, but later withdrew from the race. On March 15, Strickland won the primary with 65% of the vote.

Joseph DeMare, a machinist from Bowling Green, was the Green Party candidate. He ran unopposed in the March 15, 2016 primary, and received enough votes to substantially increase the number of enrolled Green Party members. In Ohio, the only way to join a political party is to vote in that Party's primary.

Portman defeated Strickland 58% to 37.2%.

Oklahoma 

Two-term Senator Tom Coburn (Republican) was re-elected with 71% of the vote in 2010, but chose to leave office before the end of his term after being diagnosed with prostate cancer. James Lankford won the 2014 special election to serve the remainder of Coburn's term. Lankford ran for re-election.

Former Congressman Dan Boren was viewed by some Oklahoma political operatives as the only Democrat who could make the 2016 race competitive, but was seen as unlikely to run. Lankford's 2014 special election opponent Constance N. Johnson had also declined to run.

Oregon 

Three-term Senator Ron Wyden (Democrat) was re-elected with 57% of the vote in 2010. He was 67 years old in 2016. He ran for re-election.

Medford City Councilor Kevin Stine and retired locomotive engineer Paul Weaver challenged Wyden for the Democratic nomination. Wyden won the Democratic nomination.

Information technology consultant and 2014 candidate Mark Callahan, businessman Sam Carpenter, business consultant Dan Laschober, Steven Reynolds, and Lane County commissioner Faye Stewart ran for the Republican nomination. Callahan won the Republican nomination.

Pennsylvania

One-term Senator Pat Toomey (Republican) was elected with 51% of the vote in 2010. He was 54 years old in 2016. Toomey ran for re-election.

Everett Stern, a security intelligence consultant and whistleblower of the HSBC money laundering scandal, announced that he would challenge Toomey for the Republican nomination, but missed the filing deadline, so Toomey was unopposed in the primary.

Democratic candidates included Katie McGinty, former Chief of Staff to Governor Tom Wolf and former Secretary of the Pennsylvania Department of Environmental Protection, former Congressman Joe Sestak, who defeated incumbent Senator Arlen Specter (a Democrat turned Republican turned back to Democrat) for the 2010 Democratic nomination, but lost to Toomey in the general election, the current mayor of Braddock, Pennsylvania, John Fetterman, who is an AmeriCorps alum and Harvard University graduate, and small businessman and senate candidate in 2010 and 2012 Joseph Vodvarka. Allentown Mayor Ed Pawlowski announced his candidacy for the seat but suspended his campaign due to an FBI investigation of Allentown. McGinty won the primary and faced Toomey in the general election on November 8, 2016. Toomey defeated McGinty and retained the seat.

South Carolina

Two-term Republican Senator Jim DeMint (Republican) was re-elected with 61% of the vote in 2010. He resigned at the start of 2013 to become President of The Heritage Foundation and U.S. Representative Tim Scott (Republican) of South Carolina's 1st congressional district was appointed to replace DeMint by Governor Nikki Haley.

Scott subsequently won the special election in 2014 for the remaining two years of the term. Scott ran for re-election and he was a potential Republican vice presidential nominee.

Other potential Republican candidates include Congressmen Mick Mulvaney, Jeff Duncan and Mark Sanford, along with State Senator Tom Davis, State Treasurer Curtis Loftis and State Attorney General Alan Wilson. Darla Moore was mentioned as a potential candidate for either party.

On the Democratic side, pastor Thomas Dixon ran in the general election on November 8, 2016 but was defeated by the incumbent, Scott.

South Dakota

Two-term Senator John Thune (Republican) ran unopposed and was re-elected with 100% in 2010.

Jay Williams, Chair of the Yankton County Democratic Party, and candidate for the State House in 2010 and 2014, is running for the Democratic nomination. Other potential Democratic candidates include State Senator Bernie Hunhoff and filmmaker and former television news producer Sam Hurst.

Former U.S. Representative Stephanie Herseth Sandlin, Sioux Falls Mayor Mike Heuther, and 2014 nominee Rick Weiland all declined to run.

Utah

One-term Senator Mike Lee (Republican) was elected with 62% of the vote in 2010. He was 45 years old in 2016. He ran for re-election. State party chair Thomas Wright, former State Senator Dan Liljenquist, State Senator Aaron Osmond, Congressman Jason Chaffetz, Congressman Chris Stewart, former Governor of Utah Mike Leavitt, and Mitt Romney's son Josh Romney were mentioned as potential primary challengers, but all declined to run. Lee ran unopposed at the Utah Republican convention and is the Republican nominee.

Marriage therapist Jonathan Swinton and grocery store clerk Misty Snow, a transgender woman, ran for the Democratic nomination. Snow defeated Swinton by more than 20 percentage points, running to the left of Swinton, criticizing him for supporting limitations on abortion rights. She became the first transgender woman to become a major party's nominee for the Senate.

Vermont

Seven-term Democratic Senator Patrick Leahy was re-elected with 64% of the vote in 2010. Leahy won re-election in 2016, aged 76.

Scott Milne, the Republican nominee who narrowly lost the 2014 Vermont gubernatorial election, ran unsuccessfully against Leahy.

Washington

Four-term Senator Patty Murray (Democrat) was re-elected with 52% of the vote in 2010. She ran successfully for re-election against Republican candidate Chris Vance. Congressman Dave Reichert was considered a potential Republican candidate but chose to run for reelection.

Wisconsin

One-term Senator Ron Johnson (Republican) defeated three-term Senator Russ Feingold (Democrat) with 52% of the vote in 2010.

On May 14, 2015, Feingold announced that he would seek a rematch against Johnson for his former Senate seat. Immediately after his announcement, the Democratic Senatorial Campaign Committee endorsed Feingold's candidacy. Businesswoman and 2014 gubernatorial nominee Mary Burke has declared that she is not seeking statewide office in 2016.

Johnson and Feingold faced each other again, and Johnson again defeated Feingold, in what many observers and pundits considered to be a surprising and uphill victory.

See also
 2016 United States elections (other elections being held at the same time)
 2016 United States House of Representatives elections
 2016 United States presidential election
 2016 United States gubernatorial elections
 2010 United States Senate elections (the previous election for this class of senators)

Notes

References

 
November 2016 events in the United States